It Might Happen to You is a 1920 American silent comedy film directed by Alfred Santell and starring Billy Mason, Dorris Dare and William Harcourt.

Cast
 Billy Mason as J. Worthington Butts Jr.
 Dorris Dare as 	Dolly Bender
 William Harcourt as Worthington Butts Sr.
 Walter Beckwith as Edward Winton
 Violet Mack as Tootsie
 Edward Scanlon as 	Jenks
 Helen Adams as Mrs. Butts

References

Bibliography
 Connelly, Robert B. The Silents: Silent Feature Films, 1910-36, Volume 40, Issue 2. December Press, 1998.
 Munden, Kenneth White. The American Film Institute Catalog of Motion Pictures Produced in the United States, Part 1. University of California Press, 1997.

External links
 

1920 films
1920 comedy films
1920s English-language films
American silent feature films
Silent American comedy films
Films directed by Alfred Santell
American black-and-white films
1920s American films